Birmingham Hall Green is a parliamentary constituency in the city of Birmingham, which has been represented in the House of Commons of the UK Parliament since 2019 by Tahir Ali of the Labour Party.

It has become in recent years a Labour safe seat, having the twelfth-largest majority in the UK (by percentage) with a vote share for Labour of 77.6% and majority of 62.5%, as of 2017. This is compared to only a 32.9% share of the vote and 7.8% majority that Labour achieved in 2010.

Members of Parliament

Boundaries 

1950–1955: The County Borough of Birmingham wards of Hall Green, Sparkhill and Springfield.

1955–1974: The County Borough of Birmingham wards of Brandwood, Hall Green, and Springfield.

1974–1983: The County Borough of Birmingham wards of Billesley, Brandwood, and Hall Green.

1983–2010: The City of Birmingham wards of Billesley, Brandwood, and Hall Green.

2010–present: The City of Birmingham wards of Hall Green, Moseley and King's Heath, Sparkbrook, and Springfield.

Following the Fifth Periodic Review of Westminster constituencies, the Boundary Commission for England created a modified version of the Hall Green seat which contains a third of the constituency which existed for the 1997 general election and new additions – the retained former ward is Hall Green itself – and additional wards include two from the Birmingham, Sparkbrook and Small Heath which was abolished at the 2010 general election.

Constituency profile 

The constituency is an inner suburban seat on the fringes city centre to its north and bordering Solihull in the east and south. The number of non-whites (64.5%) is high compared to the rest of the city (42%), as is the proportion of social housing (25.7%), with both figures higher than the national average. The area is home to a high number of public parks, open space and numerous tree-lined streets.

A famous landmark is Sarehole Mill, where J.R.R. Tolkien spent his boyhood, and which provided the inspiration for The Hobbit and The Lord of the Rings.

Many constituents were employed in the car industry – notably Rover's nearby factories, which have now closed down.

History
Summary of results
The 2015 result made the seat the 28th safest of Labour's 232 seats by percentage of majority.

The 2017 result made it the 12th safest seat in the UK, with a majority of 62.5% of the vote.

Hall Green, on various boundaries, elected a Conservative MP throughout the period from 1950 to 1997, and formed, with Birmingham, Edgbaston, the last of the Birmingham seats during the 1979–1997 Conservative Governments lost to Labour in 1997. This was the first time a Labour candidate had won the seat since it was created in 1950.

The 2015 result saw a +26.9% swing to the Labour Party and a correspondingly much greater than national average swing away from the Liberal Democrat candidate. This was in part due to the collapse of Respect's vote.

Turnout
Turnout has ranged from 83.1% in 1950 to 57.5% in 2001.

Elections

Elections in the 2010s

(Note that the vote-share changes for 2010 are from the notional results on the new boundaries, not the actual 2005 results)

Elections in the 2000s

Elections in the 1990s

Elections in the 1980s

Elections in the 1970s

Elections in the 1960s

Elections in the 1950s

See also 
List of parliamentary constituencies in the West Midlands (county)

Notes

References

External links 
 Birmingham city council constituency page

Parliamentary constituencies in Birmingham, West Midlands
Constituencies of the Parliament of the United Kingdom established in 1950